Kassim Parekh (31 January 1931 – 11 February 2017), was the 11th Governor of the State Bank of Pakistan from September, 1989 to August, 1990. He belong to the  Memon family and died at the age of 86.
One of his son named Muhammad Yaseen Parekh lived in Karachi, Pakistan along with his 2 sons and 1 daughter named Muhammad Waqas Parekh, Uzair Parekh and Aqsa Parekh.

References

1931 births
2017 deaths
Governors of the State Bank of Pakistan
People from Karachi
Pakistani people of Gujarati descent
Memon people